Paul William Troup III (April 2, 1951 – December 14, 2013) was a professional American football player. He was born in Pittsburgh, Pennsylvania. An undrafted quarterback from the University of South Carolina,  Troup played in seven NFL seasons from 1974 to 1980 for 2 different teams. After being released by Baltimore, Troup went north to the C.F.L.'s Winnipeg Blue Bombers, where he served as Dieter Brock's backup for the 1979 season. He saw his most extensive action for the Colts in 1978, when Bert Jones was injured and Mike Kirkland ineffective.

References

1951 births
2013 deaths
American football quarterbacks
Baltimore Colts players
Green Bay Packers players
South Carolina Gamecocks football players
Virginia Cavaliers football players